Marcel Perrot (24 February 1879 – 16 July 1969) was a French fencer. He won a silver medal in the team foil event at the 1920 Summer Olympics.

References

External links
 

1879 births
1969 deaths
People from Vendôme
French male foil fencers
Olympic fencers of France
Fencers at the 1920 Summer Olympics
Olympic silver medalists for France
Olympic medalists in fencing
Medalists at the 1920 Summer Olympics
Sportspeople from Loir-et-Cher